Reversion is a 2015 American science fiction thriller film directed by Jose Nestor Marquez and starring Aja Naomi King, Colm Feore, Amanda Plummer and Lela Rochon.

Plot

Cast
Aja Naomi King as Sophie Clé
Colm Feore as Jack Clé
Amanda Plummer as Elizabeth
Lela Rochon as Maya
Jeanette Samano as Isa Reyes
Gary Dourdan as Ayden
David Clennon as Clespy

Reception
The film has a 29% rating on Rotten Tomatoes.  Wes Greene of Slant Magazine awarded the film two stars out of four.

See also 
 Rememory, a 2017 film also dealing with a human memory device

References

External links
 
 

American science fiction thriller films
2010s science fiction thriller films
2010s English-language films
2010s American films